Slow Children is an American new wave pop group consisting of Pal Shazar and Andrew Chinich.  They released two albums on a major label, Ensign, in 1981 and 1982, and a third self-released album in 2016.

Discography

Albums
Slow Children (1981)
Mad About Town (1982)
Cottoncloud9 (2016)

Singles
 "Staring at the Ceiling" (1979)
 "President Am I" (1981)
 "Spring in Fialta" (1981) - #50 Billboard Dance
 "Talk About Horses" (1981)
 "Vanessa Vacillating" (1982)

References

External links

Slow Children Fan Site
Official SoundCloud Page
Official Faceboook Page

American new wave musical groups